SH2 domain-containing adapter protein B is a protein that in humans is encoded by the SHB gene.

Interactions 

SHB (gene) has been shown to interact with:

 EPS8, 
 Fibroblast growth factor receptor 1, 
 Linker of activated T cells, 
 Lymphocyte cytosolic protein 2, 
 PIK3R1, 
 Src, 
 VAV1, and
 ZAP-70.

References

Further reading